Lucas Tolentino Coelho de Lima (born 27 August 1997), better known as Lucas Paquetá, is a Brazilian professional footballer who plays as an attacking midfielder for Premier League club West Ham United and the Brazil national team.

Club career

Early career
Lucas Paquetá arrived at Flamengo in 2007 at the age of 10. At the age of 15, he was very technically skilled but did not have the physicality of other players his age (he was only 5 ft tall). By age 18, however, he had grown 27 cm (10.6 inches). With the Flamengo youth team he won the 2016 Copa São Paulo de Júniores title, the most important youth tournament in Brazil. Alongside other standout players Léo Duarte, Felipe Vizeu and Ronaldo, Lucas was promoted the club's professional team right after the competition.

Flamengo

In March 2016 Paquetá got promoted to Flamengo's professional team and signed a contract extension until 2020. On 5 March 2016, Lucas debuted as a starter in a 3–1 win over Bangu in a 2016 Rio de Janeiro State League match. Paquetá scored his first professional goal on 19 February 2017 in a 4–0 victory against Madureira at the Estádio Raulino de Oliveira in Volta Redonda.

Paquetá scored in both the 2017 Copa do Brasil final in a 1–1 draw against Cruzeiro at the Maracanã Stadium and in the 2017 Copa Sudamericana final against Independiente, also a 1–1 draw in the Maracanã. In both matches, Flamengo were defeated and were runners-up to their opponents in the competitions. In the Copa Sudamericana final, he was named the best Flamengo player in the match. He finished 2017 being considered by fans to be, alongside Juan, the highlight of Flamengo.

In the 2018 Campeonato Carioca, Lucas Paquetá was chosen as the best left-winger of the tournament and was the only Flamengo player selected to the team of the tournament.

AC Milan
On 10 October 2018, news agencies across Brazil and Italy reported that a €35M deal had been agreed between AC Milan and Flamengo for the transfer of player, beating stiff competition from French club Paris Saint-Germain.

On 4 January 2019, the transfer was made official, with Milan announcing the player had signed a five-year contract. He chose to wear the shirt number 39. Because of his mother's Portuguese descent, he was eligible for registration as a European player.

Paquetá made his club debut on 12 January 2019, playing 85 minutes before being replaced by Fabio Borini as Milan beat Sampdoria 2–0 in extra time in the Coppa Italia. Four days later, Paquetá played in the 2018 Supercoppa Italiana, held at the King Abdullah Sports City in Jeddah, Saudi Arabia, where Juventus beat Milan 1–0. On 21 January 2019, Paquetá made his Serie A debut in a 2–0 win over Genoa at the Stadio Luigi Ferraris. During the match, Paquetá performed a rainbow flick over opponent Daniel Bessa, flicking the rolling ball up and propelling it over the head of his opponent. Paquetá scored his first goal for Milan in 3–0 win against Cagliari, scoring the second goal. He dedicated his goal for the victims of a fire at his old club Flamengo, all members of the under-15 team.

Lyon
On 30 September 2020, French club Lyon announced the signing of Paquetá, who signed for €20 million on a five-year contract.

In the 21/22 season, the midfielder was elected the best foreign player in the French Championship, Ligue 1. The election was carried out by popular vote and was supported by more than 20,000 people. Paquetá, 25 years old, competed with the defender of PSG Marquinhos, the marfileño midfielder of Lens Fofana and the Canadian leader of Lille Jonathan David.

West Ham United
On 29 August 2022, West Ham United announced the signing of Paquetá for a club record fee undisclosed by the club. He signed a five-year contract for a fee estimated by the BBC to be more than £50m with additional add-ons, beating the fee paid for Sebastien Haller in 2019. He made his West Ham and Premier League debut on 31 August in a 1–1 home draw against Tottenham Hotspur.
On 4th January 2023, Paqueta scored his first Premier League goal and West Ham goal against Leeds United.

International career

Under-20

On 1 April 2016, Paquetá was called up for the first time to represent Brazil U20 in two friendly matches in Europe. He scored his first goal in his debut in a 2–1 win against England U20 on 4 September.

In October 2016, he was called up for the Quadrangular de Seleções tournament, a friendly round-robin against the U20 squads of Ecuador, Uruguay, and Chile.

Under-23
When he was 18, Paquetá was called to practice with the Brazil U23 team in preparation for the 2016 Summer Olympics. Coach Rogério Micale called some younger players born in 1997 and 1998, including Lucas, to participate in group training in hopes of them eventually competing in the 2020 Summer Olympics in Tokyo.

He received his first official call-up to the under-23 team in March 2020.

Senior team
In 2018, he was selected to be one of the twelve alternatives for the Brazil national team by coach Tite for the 2018 FIFA World Cup in Russia. Of the 35 players on the 23-man roster and provisional roster, Lucas was the youngest.

On 17 August 2018, Paquetá was called for the first time for the Brazil national team by manager Tite to play in friendly matches against United States and El Salvador in September. On 7 September, he made his debut with the national team, coming off the bench to replace Philippe Coutinho in the 71st minute during a friendly match against the United States. On 23 March 2019, he scored his first goal in a 1–1 friendly draw against Panama, wearing Brazil's iconic No. 10 shirt. In May 2019, he was included in Brazil's 23-man squad for the 2019 Copa América.

On 2 July 2021, in the 2021 Copa América quarter-final clash against Chile, he came on as a substitute at half-time and scored in the 47th minute to give Brazil a 1–0 win. 
On 6 July 2021, he once again scored the only goal after an assist from Neymar Junior in the semi-final against Peru.

On 7 November 2022, Paquetá was named in the squad for the 2022 FIFA World Cup.

Personal life 
Lucas has an older brother, Matheus, who also plays football. His nickname, Paquetá, refers to Paquetá Island and the eponymous neighborhood he grew up in. He is a big fan of funk carioca and sometimes imitates funk dance steps during his goal celebrations.

Career statistics

Club

International

Scores and results list Brazil's goal tally first, score column indicates score after each Paquetá goal.

Honours
Flamengo
Campeonato Carioca: 2017

Brazil
Copa América: 2019; runner-up: 2021

Individual
Campeonato Carioca Team of the Year: 2018
Bola de Prata: 2018
Campeonato Brasileiro Série A Team of the Year: 2018
UNFP Ligue 1 Team of the Year: 2020–21
UNFP Ligue 1 Player of the Month: October 2021

References

External links

 Lucas Paquetá at West Ham United F.C.
 
 
 
 
 

1997 births
Living people
Footballers from Rio de Janeiro (city)
Brazilian people of Portuguese descent
Brazilian footballers
Association football midfielders
Campeonato Brasileiro Série A players
Serie A players
Ligue 1 players
Premier League players
CR Flamengo footballers
A.C. Milan players
Olympique Lyonnais players
West Ham United F.C. players
Brazilian expatriate footballers
Brazilian expatriate sportspeople in Italy
Brazilian expatriate sportspeople in France
Brazilian expatriate sportspeople in England
Expatriate footballers in Italy
Expatriate footballers in France
Expatriate footballers in England
Brazil youth international footballers
Brazil under-20 international footballers
Brazil international footballers
2019 Copa América players
2021 Copa América players
2022 FIFA World Cup players
Copa América-winning players